Phrynium pubinerve is the type species of the plant genus Phrynium, in the family Marantaceae.  It is widespread throughout Asia, with records from India, China, and Indo-China through to New Guinea; no subspecies are listed in the Catalogue of Life.

Gallery
As with Stachyphrynium placentarium leaves of this species may be used as a wrapping for food and other items (illustrations here are from Laos).

References

External links

Marantaceae
Flora of Indo-China
plurinerve
Plants described in 1827
Taxa named by Carl Ludwig Blume